Shubha Kamana is a 1991 Bengali film directed by Anup Sengupta. This film produced by Rajib Das and Saibal Mitra.

Cast
 Rabi Ghosh
 Tapas Paul
 Debashree Roy
 Gita Dey
 Madhabi Mukherjee
 Anil Chatterjee
 Deepankar De
 Utpal Dutta
 Rajeshwari Raychoudhury
 Piya Das

Music
This film has been music composed by Ajoy Das.

References 

1991 films
Bengali-language Indian films
1990s Bengali-language films
Films directed by Anup Sengupta
Films scored by Ajoy Das